Vladimir Igorevich Kozhin (born 28 February 1959) is a Russian businessman and politician. Senator from Moscow since 2018. Previously he was an Aide to the President of Russia and head of the Control Directorate of the Presidential Administration of Russia.

Political career
In March 1993, he became the Director General of the Saint Petersburg Association of Joint Ventures. From October 1994 until September 1999, he was the Chief of the Northwestern Center of the Federal Directorate for Currency and Export Control of Russia. From 20 September 1999 until 12 January 2000, he led the Russian Federal Service for Currency and Export Control (VEK).

Since 12 January 2000, Kozhin has been the Head of the Presidential Property Management Department of the Russian Federation, appointed by President Vladimir Putin. In 2008, President Dmitry Medvedev appointed him as a member of the Presidential Executive Office.

In 2010, Kozhin was suggested to succeed chucked out Yury Luzhkov as the Mayor of Moscow.

Sanctions
On 20 March 2014, the Office of Foreign Assets Control (OFAC) published that Kozhin and 19 other men have been added to the Specially Designated Nationals List (SDN), a list of individuals sanctioned as “members of the Russian leadership’s inner circle.”

Honours and awards (selection)
 Order of Holy Prince Daniel of Moscow 3rd class (2002)
 State Prize of the Russian Federation (2003; for his efforts on the renovation of the Constantine Palace in Strelna as a new presidential residence)
 Order "For Merit to the Fatherland" 2nd class (2006); 4th class (2009)
 Order of Alexander Nevsky (2014)

External links
 Official biography

References and notes

Aides to the President of Russia
Businesspeople from Saint Petersburg
State Prize of the Russian Federation laureates
Recipients of the Order "For Merit to the Fatherland", 2nd class
1959 births
Living people
Russian individuals subject to the U.S. Department of the Treasury sanctions
Members of the Federation Council of Russia (after 2000)
1st class Active State Councillors of the Russian Federation
Northwestern Management Institute alumni